Kevin Langford (born December 21, 1985) is an American professional basketball player for BBC Monthey-Chablais of the Swiss Basketball League. He is a 2.04 m (6 ft 8½ in) tall power forward-center.

College career
Langford played college basketball at Cal, with the Golden Bears, from 2004 to 2005. He then played at TCU, with the Horned Frogs, from 2005 to 2009.

Professional career
Langford started his pro career in 2009, with the German League club Paderborn Baskets. He moved to the Hungarian League club Debrecen in 2010. In 2011, he joined the Spanish 2nd Division club Basket Navarra Club.

In 2012, he signed with the Greek League club Kolossos Rodou, and in 2013, he moved to the Greek club Panionios. He moved to the Greek club PAOK in 2014.

In August, 2015, he signed with Paris-Levallois of France. On January 19, 2016, he left Paris and signed with Antwerp Giants of the Belgian League.

On September 6, 2016, he signed with Italian club Basket Agropoli of the Serie A2 Basket. In October 2017, he signed with Argentine club Instituto of the Liga Nacional de Básquet. On March 4, 2018, Langford left Instituto and joined Koroivos of the Greek Basket League.

Langford spent the 2019–20 season with KTP Basket of the Finnish Korisliiga, averaging 11.7 points, 5.3 rebounds and 3.0 assists per game. On October 4, 2020, he signed with Charilaos Trikoupis of the Greek Basket League.

After a stint in Cyprus with APOP Paphos, Langford returned to Greece on January 10, 2022, signing with Ionikos Nikaias for the rest of the season. On March 10 of the same year, he parted ways with the club, having averaged only 2.7 points and 1.3 rebounds per game. On March 14, Langford signed with BBC Monthey-Chablais of the Swiss Basketball League.

Personal life
Langford's older brother, Keith Langford, is also a professional basketball player. His  uncle, Charles Taylor, played in the NFL, with the Kansas City Chiefs and Denver Broncos.

References

External links
Twitter account
EuroCup Profile
Eurobasket.com Profile
Draftexpress.com Profile
Greek Basket League Profile 
TCU College Profile
Sports-Reference.com College Stats

1985 births
Living people
American expatriate basketball people in Argentina
American expatriate basketball people in Belgium
American expatriate basketball people in Cyprus
American expatriate basketball people in Finland
American expatriate basketball people in France
American expatriate basketball people in Germany
American expatriate basketball people in Greece
American expatriate basketball people in Italy
American expatriate basketball people in Hungary
American expatriate basketball people in Spain
American men's basketball players
Antwerp Giants players
Basket Navarra Club players
Basketball players from Texas
California Golden Bears men's basketball players
Centers (basketball)
Charilaos Trikoupis B.C. players
Debreceni EAC (basketball) players
Ionikos Nikaias B.C. players
Kolossos Rodou B.C. players
Koroivos B.C. players
KTP-Basket players
Paderborn Baskets players
Panionios B.C. players
P.A.O.K. BC players
Metropolitans 92 players
Power forwards (basketball)
Sportspeople from Fort Worth, Texas
TCU Horned Frogs men's basketball players